Balan (also Romanized as Balān) is a village in Kuhestan Rural District, in the Central District of Nain County, Isfahan Province, Iran. At the 2006 census, its population was 586, in 146 families.

References 

Populated places in Nain County